Pascal Bessy (born 28 January 1956) is a French sports shooter. He competed in two events at the 1988 Summer Olympics.

References

External links
 

1956 births
Living people
French male sport shooters
Olympic shooters of France
Shooters at the 1988 Summer Olympics
People from Arles
Sportspeople from Bouches-du-Rhône
20th-century French people